Stukeley is a surname. Notable people with the surname include:

William Stukeley
Thomas Stukley (alternate spelling)